Gábor Székelyhidi (born 30 June 1981 in Debrecen) is a Hungarian mathematician, specializing in differential geometry.

Gábor Székelyhidi, the brother of László Székelyhidi, graduated from Trinity College, Cambridge with a bachelor's degree in 2002 (part 3 of Tripos 2003 with honours) and received from Imperial College London his PhD in 2006 under the supervision of Simon Donaldson with thesis Extremal metrics and K-stability. Székelyhidi was a postdoc at Harvard University and was from 2008 to 2011 Ritt Assistant Professor at Columbia University. At the University of Notre Dame he became an assistant professor in 2011, an associate professor in 2014, and in 2016 a full professor.

His research deals with geometric analysis and complex differential geometry (Kähler manifolds), including the existence of canonical metrics (such as extremal Kähler and Kähler-Einstein metrics) on projective manifolds, and the relations between extremal metrics and K-stability for polarised varieties and especially Fano varieties.

In 2014 he was an invited speaker at the International Congress of Mathematicians in Seoul.

Selected publications
 
 
 
 
 
 
 An introduction to extremal Kaehler metrics (pdf)

References

External links
 Homepage
 
 

20th-century Hungarian mathematicians
21st-century Hungarian mathematicians
Differential geometers
University of Notre Dame faculty
Alumni of Trinity College, Cambridge
Alumni of Imperial College London
1981 births
Living people